Imperial Sugar is a major U.S. sugar producer and marketer based in Sugar Land, Texas, with sugar refinery operations in California, Georgia, and Louisiana.  The company was established in 1843 and has undergone ownership changes multiple times.  The current name, Imperial Sugar Company, was established after a change in ownership in 1907.  The company went through major expansion through acquisitions beginning in 1988, but filed for bankruptcy in 2001, emerging in the same year and embarking on a downsizing strategy.  In May of 2012, the company was purchased by Louis Dreyfus Group of the Netherlands.

History
The company has been headquartered in Sugar Land since its inception. The city itself is named for the company and the company's crown logo is featured in the city's seal. The company was founded in 1843 by Samuel May Williams and passed through a series of owners until its purchase in 1907 by the I. H. Kempner family of Galveston. The company was later renamed the Imperial Sugar Company, in an effort to emphasize quality.  Up until 1988 the company had only one plant, at its original location in Texas, when they purchased the Holly Sugar Corporation, a sugar beet processor headquartered in Colorado Springs. At that time Imperial Sugar Company became Imperial Holly Corporation and began publicly trading on Nasdaq.

Since the initial acquisition the company has made several more acquisitions that effectively doubled the corporation's size each time. The company's name returned to Imperial Sugar Company in 1999.

On , the company filed for Chapter 11 bankruptcy protection, attributing its problems to lower sales for refined sugar as well as higher energy costs.  Then on August 29, 2001, the company emerged from Chapter 11 and has since turned its focus inward as it downsizes its operations.  In 2003, Imperial won the Wharton Infosys Business Transformation Award for innovative use of web technology to help turn around the business. The company no longer refines sugar at its original plant in Sugar Land (the facility was closed in 2003) but its corporate headquarters are still located in its founding city.

On , two buildings of the Sugar Land factory were demolished by controlled explosion to facilitate the development of the property for residences, business properties and park land.

In 2010, Imperial exchanged its aging nineteenth-century Gramercy, Louisiana refinery to Louisiana Sugar Refiners, LLC (LSR) for a one-third interest in the new company. Imperial continues to operate a small-bag processing facility at Gramercy.

2008 explosion 

On , an explosion at a Port Wentworth, Georgia, sugar refinery killed 14 people and injured more than 40. It was likely caused by an overheated bearing on a conveyor beneath the sugar silos, which ignited sugar dust, then spread in a chain reaction of sugar dust explosions in the finished-sugar packaging area of the plant. OSHA had been criticized in a 2006 US Chemical Safety Board report for lack of preparation for such explosions and a safety program that "inadequately addresses dust explosion hazards". As of August 26, 2008, the death toll had risen to 14, with one still in critical condition.

The plant, originally built as the Dixie Crystals sugar refinery in 1916–1917, had been acquired by Imperial Sugar in 1997. At the time of its purchase, the Port Wentworth refinery was the second-largest sugar refining operation in the U.S.

Acquisition by Louis Dreyfus Group 

On 1 May 2012, Louis Dreyfus Commodities LLC announced that one of its subsidiaries would acquire all outstanding Imperial Sugar stock for $6.35 per share and assume $125 million in Imperial Sugar debt.  The price per share represented a 57% premium over Imperial Sugar's closing price on 30 April.  A spokesman for Dreyfus group said the acquisition was part of the company's efforts to expand into refining and distribution of sugar.

Antitrust Lawsuit
In November 2021, US Sugar and Imperial Sugar were sued by the US Department of Justice for a proposed merger of the two companies. The Justice department claimed in a statement that the deal was anticompetitive and would “leave an overwhelming majority of refined sugar sales across the Southeast in the hands of only two producers”. Imperial Sugar and US Sugar stated that they disagreed with the antitrust lawsuit and that they fully intended to litigate.

Gallery

References

External links

 Imperial Sugar Company corporate website
 Imperial Sugar brand consumer website
 Dixie Crystals brand consumer website
 
 Imperial Sugar Commercial, no.2, from the Texas Archive of the Moving Image

Sugar companies of the United States
Companies based in Sugar Land, Texas
Food and drink companies established in 1843
1843 establishments in the Republic of Texas
Companies formerly listed on the Nasdaq
Companies that filed for Chapter 11 bankruptcy in 2001
2012 mergers and acquisitions